Shafranovo (Şafran) is a rural locality (a selo) and the administrative center of Shafranovsky Selsoviet, Alsheyevsky District, Bashkortostan, Russia. The population was 2,362 as of 2010. There are 36 streets.

Geography 
Shafranovo is located 18 km southwest of Rayevsky (the district's administrative centre) by road. Churakayevo is the nearest rural locality.

References 

Rural localities in Alsheyevsky District